Diniz d' Alpoim (c.1300-?) was a Portuguese nobleman, Lord of Esgueira, He served as ambassador to Aragon in times of Afonso IV.

Biography 
Alpoim was born in the Kingdom of Portugal, son of Luis de Alpoim, ambassador in the Holy Roman Empire and England. He was married to Elvira or Genebra Lopes, daughter of a noble family from the region of the Guarda.

Diniz d' Alpoim is buried in the monastery São Jorge, in the vicinity of Coimbra.

References

External links 
Nobiliário de familias de Portugal (ALPUINS)
1370 births
1400s deaths
Medieval Portuguese nobility
People from Coimbra
14th-century Portuguese people